The Anglican Church of St John The Evangelist at Kenn within the English county of Somerset has a Norman tower, with much of the rest of the church dating from around 1300. It has been designated as a Grade II* listed building.

The cross in the churchyard is both a Grade II listed building and has been scheduled as an ancient monument.

History

The tower is Norman with the chancel being from around 1300 and the south door from the 15th century. The rest of the building, including the nave, porch and vestry, was restored or rebuilt in the 19th century.

The parish is part of the Yatton Moor benefice within the Diocese of Bath and Wells.

Architecture

The nave is of two bays.

Within the church is a stone font believed to be from the 14th century.

The churchyard cross was restored as a war memorial after the first world war using the 14th century octagonal four step calvary (base).

References

Grade II* listed buildings in North Somerset
Grade II* listed churches in Somerset